The Bentley Falcons are composed of 21 teams representing Bentley University in intercollegiate athletics, including men and women's basketball, cross country, lacrosse, soccer, swimming & diving, tennis, and track and field. Men's sports include baseball, football, golf, and ice hockey. Women's sports include field hockey, softball, and volleyball. The Falcons compete in NCAA Division II and are members of the Northeast-10 Conference for all sports except the men's ice hockey team, which competes in Division I as a member of Atlantic Hockey.

Teams

History
Bentley's mascot is Flex the Falcon. The university has 23 men's and women's varsity teams. All of the teams compete in the Northeast-10 Conference at the NCAA Division II level, with the exception of the men's hockey program, which was one of the original six founding teams of Atlantic Hockey at the Division I level.

Bentley is also home to one of the best rugby programs in the Northeast, winning two national Division III titles as well as the 2008 Beast of the East tournament.

In 2001, the Bentley field hockey team won the NCAA Division II national championship.

In 2012, the Bentley men's cross country team finished 26th in the nation at Division II XC Nationals. Likewise in 2015, the Bentley men's cross country team qualified for the NCAA Division II Cross Country Championships and finished 30th in the nation.

After beating Saint Michael's College by a score of 85–65 on February 23, 2008, the Bentley University men's basketball team set the record for the longest regular season winning streak in Division II history. Additionally, Bentley has men's, women's, and co-ed intramural programs for the fall, winter, and spring semesters.

The Bentley women's basketball team completed the 2013–2014 season with a 35–0 record, winning the NCAA Division II National Championship.

The Bentley men's ultimate frisbee team won USA Ultimate's Division III College Championship in 2014.

The Bentley Falcons football team has made two Division II playoff appearances in back-to-back seasons in 2003 and 2004.

National championships

Team

Notable people

Players 
 Brian Hammel, '75, former Bentley basketball player and coach who was drafted by the Milwaukee Bucks in the third round of the 1975 NBA Draft
 Andy Kupec, '83, former Bentley basketball player who was drafted by the Boston Celtics in the 10th round of the 1983 NBA Draft
 Todd Orlando, '84, former Bentley basketball player who was drafted by the Boston Celtics in the 5th round of the 1984 NBA Draft
 Jack Perri, '98, head coach of men's basketball at Southern New Hampshire University, previously LIU Brooklyn
 Ryan Soderquist, '00, current head coach of Bentley Falcons men's ice hockey team and all-time points and goals leader
 Mackenzy Bernadeau, '08, professional football player who was last with the Jacksonville Jaguars organization; drafted 250th overall in 2008 NFL Draft by the Carolina Panthers
 Jason Westrol, '10, former Bentley basketball player who last played for the Limburg United of the Belgian Basketball League
 Lauren Battista, '14, All-American Women's Basketball Player – WBCA Division-II National Player of the Year, the Capital One Academic All-American of the Year, CWSA/Honda Division II Athlete of the Year, and an NCAA Today’s Top 10 Award honoree; assistant Women's Basketball Coach Princeton University
 Max Adler, '17, lacrosse player for the Denver Outlaws of Major League Lacrosse
 Ryan Berardino, '20, drafted by the Boston Red Sox in the 34th round of the 2019 Major League Baseball draft
 Jakov Novak, '22, drafted by the Ottawa Senators in the 7th round of the 2018 NHL Entry Draft

Coaches 
 Barbara Stevens, longtime women's basketball coach and Naismith Basketball Hall of Fame inductee
 Ryan Soderquist, '00, current head coach of Bentley Falcons men's ice hockey team and all-time points and goals leader
 Jack Perri, '98, head coach of men's basketball at Southern New Hampshire University, previously LIU Brooklyn
 Frank Sullivan, former Bentley men's basketball coach from 1984–1991
 Paul Cormier, former Bentley men's assistant basketball coach from 1978–1980
 Jim Ferry, former Bentley men's assistant basketball coach from 1991–1998
 Hal Kopp, Bentley football coach from 1972–1975
 Jack Regan, Bentley football coach from 1976–1978
 Peter Yetten, Bentley football coach from 1979–2008
 Thom Boerman, Bentley football coach from 2009–2013
 Robert Connors, former offensive coordinator for the Bentley football team from 1989–1997
 Peter Simonini, former Bentley men's soccer coach
 Bobby Shuttleworth, former Bentley men's soccer assistant coach and New England Revolution player

References

External links